Wild Energy may refer to:
Wild Energy (album), an album by Ruslana
"Wild Energy" (song) or "Dyka Enerhiya", a song by Ruslana
Wild Energy. Lana, a novel by Maryna and Serhiy Dyachenko

See also
Wild Energy. Amazon. Wild Dances, a DVD compilation by Ruslana